Jan Kobuszewski is the name of:

 Jan Kobuszewski (actor) (born 1934), Polish actor and comedian
 Jan Kobuszewski (athlete) (born 1947), Polish long jumper